Anarestan (also Romanized as Anārestān; also known as Anāristān and Darb Anārestān) is a village in Derakhtengan Rural District, in the Central District of Kerman County, Kerman Province, Iran. At the 2006 census, its population was 153, in 42 families.

References 

Populated places in Kerman County